Eugene F. Smith (April 23, 1916 – May 25, 2011) was an American pitcher who played for several Negro league baseball teams between  and . Listed at 6' 1", 185 lb., Smith was a switch hitter and threw right-handed. Smith was known as a hard-throwing pitcher during a solid career that saw him play for nine different Negro league clubs. In addition, he pitched for teams in Canada, Mexico, Puerto Rico and Minor League Baseball, taking a three-year break to serve in the US Army during World War II (1943–1945).

Early life 

He was born in Ansley, Louisiana. His younger brother, Quincy Smith, also played in the Negro leagues.

Negro league career 

Smith entered the Negro leagues in 1938 with the Atlanta Black Crackers, playing for them one year before joining the Ethiopian Clowns (1939), St. Louis–New Orleans Stars (1940–1941), Kansas City Monarchs (1941) and New York Black Yankees (1942). Following military discharge, he played for the Pittsburgh Crawfords (1946), Homestead Grays (1946–1947), Cleveland Buckeyes (1946–1950) and Chicago American Giants (1951).

In 1938, while pitching for the Black Crackers, Smith threw two no-hitters in one day, and in 1941 with the Stars hurled another against the Black Yankees. He also started Games 3 and 6 of the 1947 Negro World Series against the New York Cubans.

Minor leagues 

Smith ended his career in 1953, dividing his playing time with the Statesboro Pilots of the Georgia State League and the Fond du Lac Panthers of the Wisconsin State League.

Death 

Smith was a long resident of Richmond Heights, Missouri, where he died at the age of 95, following a congestive heart failure.

Sources

External References
 and Seamheads
 

1916 births
2011 deaths
Atlanta Black Crackers players
Chicago American Giants players
Cleveland Buckeyes players
Homestead Grays players
Kansas City Monarchs players
St. Louis–New Orleans Stars players
New York Black Yankees players
Pittsburgh Crawfords players
Ethiopian Clowns players
Fond du Lac Panthers players
Statesboro Pilots players
African-American baseball players
United States Army personnel of World War II
Baseball players from Louisiana
People from Jackson Parish, Louisiana
20th-century African-American sportspeople
21st-century African-American people